Australia TradeCoast is an economic development area of Brisbane, the state capital of Queensland, Australia.

The concept of branding and promoting the empty space around Brisbane's port and airport, following many years of Government reports and soul-searching on what might be done with the "Brisbane Gateway Ports Area", was first proposed to then Queensland Premier Peter Beattie by a 3PR marketing consultant who had developed Amsterdam Airport Area for Amsterdam's Schiphol Airport.

Beattie took up the idea with enthusiasm, so a partnership was formed between the Queensland Government, Brisbane City Council, Brisbane Airport and the Port of Brisbane to drive the project forward. The brand and organisational details were announced at a press conference at Brisbane Airport in May 1999.

Australia TradeCoast is expected to release and develop  of land by 2026. In 2014 there were 32 industry precincts. Brisbane Airport Corporation has nine commercial precincts for activities including  freight warehousing and distribution centres. TradeCoast Central Precinct has  of master planned industrial community and corporate office park. Business activities within the Australia TradeCoast region include around 1,500 businesses with over 60,000 employees. The region is forecast to employ more than 110,000 people by 2026.

Industry Sectors
The second largest Queensland business precinct after Brisbane's central business district, Australia Trade Coast is targeting the following industry sectors: 
 Aviation & Aerospace
 Building & Construction
 Business Services
 Food Manufacturing
 Innovative Manufacturing
 Retail
 Shipping & Marine
 Transport & Logistics.

Board of directors
Australia TradeCoast’s board has representatives from the organisation’s shareholding partner, including the Port of Brisbane Pty Ltd, Brisbane Airport Corporation, Department of Employment, Economic Development and Innovation and Brisbane City Council – Brisbane Marketing.
 Russell Smith - Chair
 Rob Whiddon - Trade and Investment Queensland’s Managing Director
Julieanne Alroe - Brisbane Airport Corporation Managing Director & CEO,
 David Askern - Brisbane City Council Chief Legal Officer
 John Aitken - Chief Executive Officer of Brisbane Marketing

Trade Coast Central

TradeCoast Central is a fully integrated masterplanned corporate office park and industrial community on the former Eagle Farm Brisbane Airport site adjacent to the Gateway Arterial Motorway. Three notable heritage sites lie within Trade Coast Central, the convict era Eagle Farm Agricultural Establishment, Women's Prison and Female Factory and the World War Two Allison Engine Testing Stands.

References

 New Parallel Runway Draft EIS/MDP Middle Banks, Moreton Bay Chapter 1. Brisbane Airport Corporation
 Strategic Infrastructure Plan (2007) Australia TradeCoast Ltd

External links 
 Australia Trade Coast 

Economy of Queensland
Brisbane
Economy of Brisbane